Athrixia is a genus of flowering plants in the family Asteraceae.

 Species
Athrixia is native to Southern Africa.

References

Gnaphalieae
Asteraceae genera
Flora of Southern Africa